Country Life is a 1994 Australian drama film, adapted from the 1899 play Uncle Vanya by Anton Chekhov. The film was directed by Michael Blakemore. The cast includes Sam Neill, Greta Scacchi, John Hargreaves and Googie Withers. It was entered into the 19th Moscow International Film Festival.

Plot
The film is set in Australia 1919, just a year after World War I. Australia begins to question the value of continuing as an outpost to the British Empire. Since his sister's death years ago, Jack Dickens has raised his niece Sally, aided by his sharp-tongued maid Hannah. Sally's father, Alexander Voysey, abandoned her after her mother's death and took off for the bright lights of the city, ostensibly making a name for himself as a literary critic and writer in London. Jack and Sally have sacrificed their own hopes and dreams to run the farm while Voysey disports himself in the city. Despite the claims of success, Voysey is a self-centered, self-aggrandizing, pompous windbag with no visible means of support beyond leeching off his brother-in-law's labours on the farm.

Voysey has remarried a younger woman, Deborah, who has come to regret her marriage. Voysey subjects Deborah to cruel behavior from him, such as fetching things he's dropped at his whim and making advances to other women right in front of her. Deborah is deeply unhappy, and feels that she has wasted her youth and squandered her life in marrying Voysey. Both Jack and the town doctor are soon smitten by Deborah, while Sally pines for the town doctor herself.  The true natures, characters, and hopes and dreams within the family are revealed as things fall apart.

Cast

Sam Neill as Dr. Max Askey
Greta Scacchi as Deborah Voysey
John Hargreaves as Jack Dickens
Kerry Fox as Sally Voysey
Michael Blakemore as Alexander Voysey
Googie Withers as Hannah
Patricia Kennedy as Maud Dickens
Ron Blanchard as Wally Wells
Robyn Cruze as Violet
Maurie Fields as Fred Livingstone
Bryan Marshall as Mr. Pettinger
Tony Barry as Logger
Terry Brady as Logger
Tom Long as Billy Livingstone
Rob Steele as James	
Ian Bliss as David Archdale	
Colin Taylor as Mr Wilson	
Ian Cockburn as Mr Archdale	
Reg Cribb as Vicar

Box office
Country Life grossed $360,957 at the box office in Australia.

Home media
Country Life was released on DVD by Umbrella Entertainment in May 2012. The DVD is compatible with all region codes and includes a behind-the-scenes special feature.

References

External links
 
 
Country Life at Oz Movies

1994 films
1994 drama films
Australian drama films
1990s English-language films
Films based on Uncle Vanya